Ring of Honor (ROH) is an American professional wrestling promotion. 

In professional wrestling, Ring of Honor may also refer to:

Ring of Honor Wrestling, ROH's primary television show.

Ring of Honor may also refers to an honor given by several North American sports teams to notable members of the organization. Typically, the person's name would be permanently displayed on the facade of a stadium balcony. Individual teams with this honor include:
Arizona Cardinals Ring of Honor
Atlanta Falcons Ring of Honor
Baltimore Ravens Ring of Honor
Cincinnati Bengals Ring of Honor
Cleveland Browns Ring of Honor
Dallas Cowboys Ring of Honor
Denver Broncos Ring of Fame
Gator Football Ring of Honor
Houston Texans Ring of Honor
Indianapolis Colts Ring of Honor
Minnesota Vikings Ring of Honor
New Orleans Saints Ring of Honor
New York Giants Ring of Honor
New York Jets Ring of Honor
Phoenix Suns Ring of Honor
San Diego Chargers Ring of Honor
St. Louis Football Ring of Fame
Seattle Seahawks Ring of Honor
Tampa Bay Buccaneers Ring of Honor
Tennessee Titans Ring of Honor
Vancouver Canucks Ring of Honour
Washington Nationals Ring of Honor
Washington Redskins Ring of Fame